Fort Stockton is a city in and the county seat of Pecos County, Texas, United States. Its population was 8,283 at the 2010 census.

History 
Fort Lancaster sent 1st Infantry Co. H "to take post" along Comanche Springs on 12 April 1859.  Fort Stockton (named Camp Stockton until 1860) grew up around Comanche Springs, one of the largest sources of spring water in Texas. The fort was named for First Lieutenant Edward Dorsey Stockton of the US 1st infantry, who died in San Antonio on March 13, 1857. Comanche Springs was a favorite rest stop on the Great Comanche Trail to Chihuahua, San Antonio-El Paso Road, and the Butterfield Overland Mail route.  On October 2, 1859, the well-known journalist and author (and future Union spy) Albert D. Richardson passed through Camp Stockton, which he described as "a military post of three or four edifices with pearly, misty mountains in the background."

In 1861, the fort was garrisoned by 39 men of Company C, 8th Infantry, under the command of Capt. Arthur Tracy Lee, who evacuated the fort by April.  The Confederates took possession of the fort on 9 May by Charles L. Pyron at the outbreak of the Civil War, but soon turned command over to Capt. William C. Adams. With the failure of John Baylor's invasion of New Mexico, a general Confederate evacuation of West Texas occurred in 1862.

In 1867, the Army rebuilt the fort on a larger and more permanent basis.  Other forts in the frontier fort system were Forts Griffin, Concho, Belknap, Chadbourne, Richardson, Davis, Bliss, McKavett, Clark, McIntosh, Inge, and Phantom Hill in Texas, and Fort Sill in Oklahoma.  "Subposts or intermediate stations" also were used, including Bothwick's Station on Salt Creek between Fort Richardson and Fort Belknap, Camp Wichita near Buffalo Springs between Fort Richardson and Red River Station, and Mountain Pass between Fort Concho and Fort Griffin.

On 21 July 1867, Fort Stockton was reoccupied by Companies A, B, E, and K of the 9th U.S. Cavalry Regiment, buffalo soldiers under the command of General Edward Hatch, while a new fort was built one-half mile north of the first post, on the west side of the creek. Major James F. Wade took command of Troops A, B, D, and E, 9th Cavalry, and Company G, 41st Infantry, on 2 Oct. 1868.  Lt. Col. Wesley Merritt assumed command of Companies A and D, 9th Cavalry, G, 24th Infantry, and K, 25th Infantry in Feb. 1871.  Major Zenas Randall Bliss assumed command on 15 May 1872. 
Troops B, G, and L, 10th Cavalry, and Companies A and I, 1st Infantry, under Lt. Col. J.F. Wade, were stationed at the fort when the Army decided to abandon it in 1882.  Major George A. Purington was the last commander when the Army finally left on 27 June 1886.

San Antonio entrepreneurs were convinced the water from the nearby Comanche and Leon Springs could be used for irrigation. They purchased large tracts of land for agricultural development. In 1868, Peter Gallagher bought the land that included the military garrison and Comanche Springs, platted  for a town site named Saint Gaul, and established two stores at Comanche Springs. Later, Gallagher and John James purchased  along Comanche Creek. By 1870, the Saint Gaul region had a population of 420 civilians, predominantly Irish, German, and Mexican Catholics who had come by way of San Antonio. The first church in Saint Gaul was Catholic. When Pecos County was organized in 1875, Saint Gaul became the county seat. The name, however, was never popular with the citizens, and on August 13, 1881, it was changed officially to Fort Stockton.

By 1870, some settlers were using the water from the Pecos River for irrigation. Seven years later, irrigated farmland comprised , and by 1945, the total reached . In 1951, Clayton Williams Sr. and other "pump farmers" west of town drilled irrigation wells that tapped into the aquifer that fed Comanche Springs. A lawsuit was filed by the Pecos County Water District #1, and 108 families who depended on the flow from the springs, to stop the pumping (Pecos County Water District #1 v. Clayton Williams et al.). On June 21, 1954, the Texas Court of Civil Appeals ruled in favor of Clayton Williams, et al. by upholding "the rule of capture", agreeing with the landmark 1904 Texas Supreme Court decision that groundwater was "too mysterious to regulate". The Texas Supreme Court affirmed the decision. By the late 1950s, Comanche Springs was dry due to the pumping. This ruling established what is known as "the rule of capture" and has regulated groundwater in Texas since. In his book, The Springs of Texas, author Gunnar Brune called the destruction of Comanche Springs, "the most spectacular example of man's abuse of nature."
After the military post was abandoned on June 30, 1886, and both the Texas and Pacific and the Southern Pacific railroads had bypassed it, Fort Stockton experienced a decline. By then, however, it was rapidly becoming the center for an extensive sheep- and cattle-ranching industry, and in 1926, the opening of the nearby Yates Oil Field brought on an economic boom.  Fort Stockton was served by the Kansas City, Mexico and Orient Railway.

Since the 1920s, Fort Stockton has experienced the economic boom-bust cycle of the petroleum industry. As of 2012, Fort Stockton is in a state of economic expansion as oilfield drilling and production has increased.

The town is within driving distance of the Big Bend country, including Big Bend National Park, and the Big Bend Ranch State Park, as well as the scenery of numerous day-drive locations in the area.

Geography

Demographics

2020 census

As of the 2020 United States census, 8,466 people, 3,030 households, and 2,014 families were residing in the city.

2010 census
As of the census of 2010, 8,535 people, 2,790 households, and 2,106 families resided in the city. The 3,189 housing units averaged 622.4 per square mile (240.5/km). The racial makeup of the city was 70.6% White, 0.89% African American, 0.57% Native American, 0.76% Asian, 0.01% Pacific Islander, 25.16% from other races, and 2.54% from two or more races. Hispanics or Latinos of any race were 71% of the population.

Of the 2,790 households, 39.2% had children under 18 living with them, 58.1% were married couples living together, 13.3% had a female householder with no husband present, and 24.5% were not families. About 21.7% of all households were made up of individuals, and 9.6% had someone living alone who was 65  or older. The average household size was 2.78, and the average family size was 3.25.

In the city, the age distribution was 30.1% under 18, 9.9% from 18 to 24, 25.6% from 25 to 44, 20.8% from 45 to 64, and 13.6% who were 65 or older. The median age was 33 years. For every 100 females, there were 92.1 males. For every 100 females 18 and over, there were 89.9 males.

The median income for a household in the city was $27,713, and for a family was $30,941. Males had a median income of $25,735 versus $17,885 for females. The per capita income for the city was $12,834. About 19.7% of families and 22.3% of the population were below the poverty line, including 30.6% of those under 18 and 17.7% of those 65 or over.

Education
The City of Fort Stockton is served by the Fort Stockton Independent School District.

Fort Stockton has two elementary schools, Alamo Elementary and Apache Elementary, both of which house kindergarten through grade 3. Fort Stockton Intermediate School houses grades 4–5, while Fort Stockton Middle School houses grades 6–8 and Fort Stockton High School houses grades 9–12. The city and district share the old Alamo school building, using it for the Recreation Department to host Little League games. Another older school, Comanche, is now privately owned. Butz High School now serves as the alternative education facility. Prekindergarten services, as well as other child-care facilities, exist in town.

Higher education
The town has a Texas A&M Agrilife Extension Office, offering environmental systems management courses.

Fort Stockton is also home to the Midland College Williams Regional Technical Training Center. The center was built in 1996 through a joint effort by Midland College and leaders of Fort Stockton education, business, and government as a means to enhance higher education and workforce development in this part of West Texas. Fort Stockton and Pecos County are part of the Midland College service area. After just four years, the facility, named in honor of Fort Stockton native and WRTTC donor Clayton Williams Jr., doubled in size through fundraising and program development.

Climate 
The data below were collected by the WRCC over the years 1940–2019.

Area ranches

The Fort Stockton Division of La Escalera Ranch consists of 223,000 contiguous acres in Pecos County and Brewster County, and stretches from U.S. Highway 285 to U.S. Highway 67. The Seymour division of La Escalera Ranch near Seymour, Texas, consists of 34,000 contiguous acres in Baylor County and Archer County.

For more than 100 years, Elsinore Cattle Company owned and operated the Elsinore Ranch ("LS Ranch") in Pecos County and Brewster Counties.  In 1992, San Antonio building contractor Gerald Lyda purchased the ranch, expanded its size, and changed the name to La Escalera Ranch (Spanish for "the ladder").

The Fort Stockton division of the ranch is known for its desert mule deer, pronghorns, elk, Barbary sheep (aoudad), coyotes, bobcats, Rio Grande turkeys, and quail.  The Seymour division is known for its white-tailed deer, dove, quail, turkeys, coyotes, and feral pigs.

The historic Comanche War Trail passes through the Fort Stockton division ranch and the internationally famous Sierra Madera crater is located on the east side of U. S. Route 385 near the entrance to the Fort Stockton division ranch headquarters.

La Escalera Ranch has been ranked by Texas Monthly, Worth, and The Land Report as one of the largest ranches in Texas.

Notable people
 Walter L. Buenger (born 1951), historian of Texas and the American South at Texas A&M University, was reared in Fort Stockton
 Terri Hoffman, religious cult leader
 Gerald Lyda, Texas building contractor and owner of La Escalera Ranch
 Blaine McCallister, professional golfer

References

Notes

External links

 Historic Fort Stockton
 Fort Stockton in the Handbook of Texas
 The Fort Stockton Pioneer

 
Cities in Pecos County, Texas
County seats in Texas
San Antonio–El Paso Road
Butterfield Overland Mail in Texas
San Antonio–San Diego Mail Line
Stagecoach stops in the United States
1859 establishments in Texas
Populated places established in 1859